Shalbay Kulmakhanuly Kulmakhanov (Şalbai Qūlmahanūly Qūlmahanov; born January 20, 1946) served as the Mayor of Almaty in Kazakhstan and Minister of Emergency Situations of Kazakhstan until the political shakeup of 2007 when Viktor Khrapunov replaced him.

See also
Government of Kazakhstan

References

Living people
Government ministers of Kazakhstan
1946 births